This article details the Bradford Bulls rugby league football club's 2006 season, the 11th season of the Super League era.

Season review

February 2006

March 2006

April 2006

May 2006

2006 Milestones

WCC: Marcus Bai and Stanley Gene scored their 1st tries for the Bulls.
Round 1: Paul Deacon reached 1,700 points for the Bulls.
Round 5: Marcus St Hilaire scored his 1st try for the Bulls.
Round 7: Chris McKenna scored his 1st try for the Bulls.
Round 10: Terry Newton scored his 1st try for the Bulls.
Round 12: Stanley Gene scored his 1st hat-trick for the Bulls.
Round 12: Brett Ferres kicked his 1st goal for the Bulls.
Round 16: Paul Deacon reached 1,800 points for the Bulls.
Round 19: Karl Pryce scored his 25th try and reached 100 points for the Bulls.
Round 20: Karl Pryce scored his 2nd hat-trick for the Bulls.
Round 23: Lesley Vainikolo scored his 125th try and reached 500 points for the Bulls.
Round 23: Paul Deacon kicked his 800th goal for the Bulls.
Round 25: Jamie Langley scored his 25th try and reached 100 points for the Bulls.
Round 25: Paul Deacon reached 1,900 points for the Bulls.
Round 28: Sam Burgess scored his 1st try for the Bulls.
EPO: Shontayne Hape scored his 1st four-try haul and 4th hat-trick for the Bulls.
ESF: Michael Withers scored his 8th hat-trick for the Bulls.
ESF: Michael Withers reached 500 points for the Bulls.

Table

World Club Challenge

2006 Fixtures and results

2006 Engage Super League

Challenge Cup

Playoffs

2006 squad statistics

 Appearances and Points include (Super League, Challenge Cup and Play-offs) as of 2012.

References

External links
Bradford Bulls Website
Bradford Bulls in T&A
Bradford Bulls on Sky Sports
Bradford on Super League Site
Red,Black And Amber
BBC Sport-Rugby League 

Bradford Bulls seasons
Bradford Bulls